Club Sandwich (Spanish: Club Sándwich) is a 2013 Mexican comedy film written and directed by Fernando Eimbcke. It was screened in the Contemporary World Cinema section at the 2013 Toronto International Film Festival. It won the Golden Shell at the 2013 San Sebastián film festival.

Cast
 Lucio Giménez Cacho
 María Renée Prudencio
 Danae Reynaud

References

External links
 

2013 films
2013 comedy films
Films directed by Fernando Eimbcke
Mexican comedy films
2010s Spanish-language films
2010s Mexican films